The 1932 World Archery Championships was the 2nd edition of the event. It was held in Warsaw, Poland on 11–16 August 1932 and was organised by World Archery Federation (FITA).

Medals summary

Recurve

Medals table

References

External links
 World Archery website
 Complete results

World Championship
World Archery
World Archery Championships
International archery competitions hosted by Poland